Bhayavadar is a town and a municipality in Rajkot district in the Indian state of Gujarat.

History
At the collapse of the Mughal Empire, Bhayavadar fell into the hands of the Desais, who in about 1753 sold it to Jadeja Haloji of Gondal State. The Tarikh-i-Sorath says that Kumbhoji acquired Bhayavadar but probably he openly assumed the sovereignty while the sale took place in Haloji' s time. Bhayavadar is about eleven miles north of the Bhadar river, which is crossed by the bridge built by the Gondal Darbar at Supedi.

Geography
It has an average elevation of 71 metres (232 feet).

Demographics
 India census, Bhayavadar had a population of 18,246. Males constitute 51% of the population and females 49%. The population according to the census of 1881 was 5197 souls.

References

 This article incorporates text from a publication now in the public domain: 

Cities and towns in Rajkot district